Mianzhu is a county-level city of Deyang, Sichuan province in Southwest China.

The city was heavily damaged during the 2008 Sichuan earthquake. Fuxin No. two Primary School collapsed.

Administrative divisions

Mianzhu has 19 towns and two townships:

Towns
Jiannan
Dongbei
Xi'nan
Xinglong
Jiulong
Zhundao
Hanwang
Gongxing
Tumen
Guangji
Jinhua
Yuquan
Banqiao
Xinshi
Xiaode
Fuxin
Qitian
Shidi
Mianyuan

Townships
Qingping
Tianchi

Climate

Economic
Mianzhu is a symbolic place presenting the south-west cities which produce special products, such as the peal from Jiulong Mountain, a branch of Longmen Mountain. One of the most well-known wines around the country, even the world, is Jian Nan Chun, s kind of traditionally Chinese spirit with a history of 500 years. The quote of this company is "what you drink today is what was the Tang Dynasty Palace spirit". The value of JNC' products was at least above three million RMB each year. After 2008, in which year the big earthquake happened,the amount have been decreasing to 80 billion since numerous fundamental spirit used to season the taste was lost. Except this famous spirit factory, a dozen of relative smaller companies still work well, Jin Qi FU included.

Culture
Mianzhu New Year Painting is one of the four greatest New Year Paintings in China. Putting New Year Paintings on the front doors of a house is one of many traditional ways to celebrate Chinese Spring Festival in many parts of China. In one such painting, the artists use water colors to draw figures like Fu Wa, wishing the little boy could bring fortune and good luck to the entire family in the coming year. Recently, some New Year Painting workshops in Mianzhu are opened to the visitors and general public so that they could have a closer look at the entire process of how artists are actually making the New Year Painting.

Lingguan Tower blaze 
Lingguan Tower complex of Nine Dragons Monastery in Jiulong town, the tallest pre-modern then standing wooden pagoda structure, was a 16-story gold covered pagoda from the Ming Dynasty that burned down on Dec 11, 2017. It was being renovated after the 2008 earthquake damaged it.

Sports

The Mianzhu Sports Centre Stadium is located in Mianzhu. It has a capacity of 10,000 and it is used mostly for association football.

References

External links
Official website of Mianzhu Government

 
County-level cities in Sichuan
Deyang